The Enniscorthy Echo was a local newspaper published once per week (every Wednesday) in County Wexford, Ireland. It was published in colour.

History
The newspaper was first published in 1902 from offices at Abbey Square, Enniscorthy, County Wexford. It was founded by William Sears and Sir Thomas Esmonde. In 1908 it moved its offices to Mill Park Road, Enniscorthy. In March 2008, the newspaper moved to new offices - located at Slaney Place, Enniscorthy.

The newspaper was part of the Thomas Crosbie Holdings group. Thomas Crosbie Holdings went into receivership in March 2013. The newspaper was acquired by Landmark Media Investments.

In June 2017, a liquidator was appointed to the Wexford Echo Limited. The liquidator will keep the publications going while they seek a buyer.

Content
The newspaper contained stories relating primarily to Enniscorthy town and its surrounding area, as well as stories relating to County Wexford.

It also contained a large number of photographs, which were published in colour. It had a sports section. It also published court reports. Advertisements took up much of the back section of the paper.

References

1902 establishments in Ireland
Defunct newspapers published in Ireland
Echo
Mass media in County Wexford
Newspapers published in the Republic of Ireland
Publications established in 1902
Thomas Crosbie Holdings